William Alysaundre (died after 1313) was an Irish judge and Crown official in the reigns of King Edward I of England and his son.

He was living in Dublin in 1286. In 1299 he was appointed High Sheriff of Kildare, apparently the first recorded holder of the office. In 1300 he was appointed one of the four itinerant justices for County Louth (John de Ponz being another). It is known that he went on circuit as itinerant judge in County Tipperary, and an order survives in the Close Rolls of 1306 for the payment of his half-years' salary of £10 in connection with his duties as a judge in Tipperary. He was appointed a justice of the Court of the Justiciar of Ireland in 1311.

He was Deputy Justiciar of Ireland in 1313. In that capacity he went on assize to Tipperary yet again (sitting in Cashel) with Walter de Thornbury, the Lord Chancellor of Ireland, in March. While they also heard civil cases, and the warrant of appointment refers only to such cases, the main business was the trial of William Ohassy for the murder of John de Nash, for which he was found guilty and condemned to be hanged. Shortly after pronouncing the death sentence, Thornbury was dead himself in a shipwreck, on his way to the Papal Court at Avignon to secure election as Archbishop of Dublin. Alysaundre's own date of death is not recorded.

Sources
Ball, F. Elrington The Judges in Ireland 1221-1921 London John Murray 1926
Calendar of Irish Chancery Letters c.1244-1509
Patent Rolls  and Close Rolls Edward I
O'Flanagan, J. Roderick Lives of the Lord Chancellors and Keepers of the Great Seal of Ireland London 2 Volumes 1870

Notes

 

14th-century Irish judges
High Sheriffs of Kildare
13th-century Irish judges